Blackjack Mountain is a scenic landmark, located in the very southwest corner of Carroll County, Georgia on the Georgia-Alabama border and Heard County line. The nearest city is Ephesus, Georgia,  to the south.

While not an impressive mountain, at 1,545 ft (471 m) the summit is the highest point in Georgia south of Interstate 20. Blackjack Mountain is a long north–south trending ridge. The Native Americans used this promontory as a reference point on their east–west trading path and are believed to have used the summit for sacred ceremonies. The mountain was named for its blackjack oak timber.

Conservation 

In 2003, Carroll County earmarked about $19 million for land conservation, parks and recreation. Blackjack Mountain was a high land conservation priority. In early 2005, the Trust for Public Land (TPL) helped the county protect Blackjack Mountain.
Blackjack is named for all of the Blackjack oaks that grow on it.

References 

Protected areas of Carroll County, Georgia
Ridges of Georgia (U.S. state)
Parks in Georgia (U.S. state)
Landforms of Carroll County, Georgia